Ganiyu Oboh is a Nigerian professor of Applied Biochemistry at the Federal University of Technology Akure. He is currently the head of Functional Food and Nutraceutical Laboratory Unit in the Department of Biochemistry and has recommended a cure to diabetes. In 2021, he was awarded the best researcher according to Alper-Doger Scientific Index.

Education 
Ganiyu Oboh obtained his first degree in Federal University of Technology Akure , Department of Biochemistry in 1992, Masters Technology and Ph.D degrees in Applied Biochemistry in 1997 and 2002 respectively in the same institution. He did his post-doctoral training in Biochemistry Toxicology in 2005 at Universidade Federal de Santa Maria, Santa Maria RS, Brazil and his second post-doctoral training in Food Biochemistry and Toxicology between 2007 and 2008 at Technische Universität Dresden, Germany.

References 

Living people

Year of birth missing (living people)
Nigerian biochemists
Federal University of Technology Akure alumni
Academic staff of the Federal University of Technology Akure